, literally “Japanese-style dressing”, is a vinaigrette-type salad dressing based on tosazu (a kind of Japanese vinegar), popular in Japan.

The standard wafu dressing consists of a mixture of Japanese soy sauce, rice vinegar, mirin, and vegetable oil. There are many variations flavoured with additional ingredients, such as aonori, shiso, grated ginger, katsuobushi, umeboshi puree, wasabi, or citrus fruits, such as lemon or yuzu. A variation incorporating sesame oil  is called , meaning “Chinese dressing”, and a salad dressed with chūka dressing is called , meaning "Chinese-style salad".

See also
Ginger dressing
Japanese cuisine

References

Salad dressings
Brand name condiments
Japanese condiments